William Pease may refer to:
 William Pease (professor), American professor of medicine
 William Harper Pease, American conchologist, shell collector and malacologist
 William Edwin Pease, English businessman and politician
 Billy Pease, English footballer